ire'ne lara silva is a Chicana feminist poet and writer from Austin, Texas. Her parents were migrant farmworkers. She has published numerous works of poetry and her short story collection won the 2013 Premio Aztlán Literary Prize. A central theme of her work is Indigenous survival and perseverance despite colonization: "let's empower ourselves with that knowledge."

Early years
silva, who has adopted the convention of spelling her name all lowercase, grew up in the Rio Grande Valley of South Texas. Her parents were migrant farmworkers and she spent many years with her family moving "from South Texas to Mathis to Oklahoma to New Mexico to the Panhandle and back to South Texas."

Writing career
silva is the author of three chapbooks of poetry, two full-length books of poetry, and one short story collection. Her work has appeared in various journals including Acentos Review, Pilgrimage, and Yellow Medicine Review and various anthologies including Improbable Worlds: An Anthology of Texas and Louisiana Poets and The Weight of Addition: An Anthology of Texas Poetry.

silva's collection, blood sugar canto, was published by Saddle Road Press in January 2016. silva served as co-editor with Dan Vera for IMANIMAN: Poets Reflect on Transformative & Transgressive Borders Through Gloria Anzaldúa's Work, published by Aunt Lute Books (2016).

Awards and prizes
Her first full-length collection of poetry furia received an honorable mention for the 2011 International Latino Book Award. Her short story collection flesh to bone won the 2013 Premio Aztlán Literary Prize, was a fiction finalist for A Room of Her Own Foundation's 2013 Gift of Freedom Award, and was a finalist for Foreword Review's Book of the Year Award in Multicultural Fiction.

silva is the recipient of the 2014 Alfredo Cisneros del Moral Award and the 2008 recipient of the Gloria Anzaldúa Milagro Award. silva was a founding fellow of the CantoMundo Writers Conference.

From 2004 to 2008, silva was the Executive Coordinator of the prestigious Macondo Writers Workshop, the workshop founded by Sandra Cisneros. She was a co-director of the Flor De Nopal Literary Festival.

Works

Poetry
 ani'mal, La Loba Press, (2001), reprinted Axoquentlatoa Press, (2010)
 INDíGENA, La Loba Press, (2001), reprinted Axoquentlatoa Press, (2010)
 furia, London: Mouthfeel Press, (2010)
 Enduring Azucares, Little Rock: Sibling Rivalry Press, (2015)
 blood sugar canto, Hilo: Saddle Road Press (2016)
 Cuicacalli / House of Song, Saddle Road Press, 2019

Short stories
 flesh to bone, San Francisco: Aunt Lute Books, (2013)

As editor
 , with Dan Vera and an introduction by United States Poet Laureate Juan Felipe Herrera

References

External links
 Author website
 Author page at Poets & Writers
 Interview with the ire'ne lara silva  on Poetry Foundation blog

21st-century American poets
21st-century American women writers
Living people
American people of Mestizo descent
American poets of Mexican descent
American women poets
Chicana feminists
Hispanic and Latino American autobiographers
American autobiographers
Lesbian feminists
American lesbian writers
LGBT Hispanic and Latino American people
LGBT people from Texas
American LGBT poets
Mestizo writers
People from Hidalgo County, Texas
People from Austin, Texas
Poets from Texas
Queer feminists
Radical feminists
Year of birth missing (living people)
American women non-fiction writers
21st-century American non-fiction writers
Women autobiographers